Patelloctopodidae is a family of stem-octopod cephalopods from the Middle and Late Jurassic of Europe. Five genera are currently placed in the family, Etchesia, Muenstellerina, Patelloctopus, Pearciteuthis and Tyrionella, Patelloctopodidae is one of two families in the superfamily Muensterelloidea along with the Muensterellidae.<ref name="fuchs&schweigert2018"/ They are thought to be the group from which modern octopus arose.

References

Octopuses
Prehistoric cephalopod families